Madeleine Thétu (born 23 November 1937) is a French athlete. She competed in the women's long jump at the 1960 Summer Olympics.

References

1937 births
Living people
Athletes (track and field) at the 1960 Summer Olympics
French female long jumpers
Olympic athletes of France
Place of birth missing (living people)